Sir Richard Wingfield KG of Kimbolton Castle (c. 1469 – 22 July 1525) was an influential courtier and diplomat in the early years of the Tudor dynasty of England.

Life
He was born at Letheringham, Suffolk to Sir John Wingfield (c. 1428 – 10 May 1481) and his wife Elizabeth FitzLewis (c. 1431–1497). He was the eleventh of twelve sons; and brother to Humphrey Wingfield. His paternal grandparents were Sir Robert Wingfield and Elizabeth Gousell. He was one of the major landowners in Huntingdonshire and lived at Kimbolton Castle.

Wingfield became a courtier during the reign of Henry VII of England. He married Catherine Woodville sometime after 1495. She was daughter to Richard Woodville, 1st Earl Rivers and Jacquetta of Luxembourg, sister to Elizabeth Woodville, sister-in-law to Edward IV of England and widow of both Henry Stafford, 2nd Duke of Buckingham, and Jasper Tudor, 1st Duke of Bedford. The marriage made him an uncle-by-marriage to Queen consort Elizabeth of York and her husband Henry VII.

He was made Lord Deputy of Calais in 1511. With Sir Edward Poynings and others he was sent in 1512 to arrange a Holy League between Pope Julius II, the English king and other European sovereigns.

In 1514, Wingfield was sent to the Netherlands in order to attempt the arrangement of a marriage between Archduke Charles of Austria and Princess Mary Tudor of England, to secure a dynastic alliance between the Tudors and the rising Habsburgs. But Wingfield's mission failed, and Mary Tudor was married to Louis XII of France in 1514. Wingfield was also occupied in discharging his duties at Calais, but in 1519 he resigned his post there and returned to England.

In 1520, Wingfield was appointed ambassador to the court of Francis I of France. He is known to have helped to arrange the meeting between Henry VIII of England and Francis at the Field of the Cloth of Gold. He twice visited Emperor Charles V in 1521 in an effort to convince him against declaring war on Francis I.

Henry VIII created him a Knight of the Garter in 1522. The future Ferdinand I, Holy Roman Emperor was the only other Knight created during that year. Wingfield was made Chancellor of the Duchy of Lancaster in 1524. For his services Wingfield was granted lands throughout the Kingdom of England, notably Kimbolton Castle which was further expanded by him.

In 1525 Wingfield was sent by Henry VIII on a mission to the Spanish court at Toledo. He died there on 22 July 1525 and was buried at the church of San Juan de los Reyes. His widow was later married first to Sir Nicholas Harvey of Ickworth and secondly to Sir Robert Tyrwhitt of Kettleby.

Family
Wingfield married Catherine, née Woodville, shortly after the 1495 death of her second husband, Jasper Tudor; she was a sister of Queen Elizabeth Woodville. Catherine died in 1497, and Wingfield was a widower for some time. He married in about 1513, his second wife, Bridget Wiltshire, daughter and heiress of Sir John Wiltshire of Stone Castle and Isabella Clothall. They were parents to ten children:

Charles Wingfield of Kimbolton Castle (1513 – 24 May 1540). He married Joan Knollys, a sister to Sir Francis Knollys and sister-in-law to Lady Catherine Carey.
Thomas Maria Wingfield of Stonely Priory, Huntingdonshire. A Member of Parliament. He first married Margaret, widow of naval captain William Sabyn, and secondly Margaret Kerrye.
Jacques Wingfield of Stone Castle (c. 1519–1587?). A politician first known for long-term service to Stephen Gardiner, Bishop of Winchester.
Lawrence Henry Wingfield.
Jane Wingfield. Married first Thomas Worlich of Alconbury and secondly Francis Roe.
Mary Wingfield.
Margaret Wingfield. She married first Sir Thomas Newman and secondly a son of the Moyle family.
Anne Wingfield. She married into the Maidenhead family.
Elizabeth Wingfield. She married into the Latimer family.
Catherine Wingfield.

Notes

References

1450s births
1525 deaths
15th-century English people
16th-century English people
People from Suffolk Coastal (district)
Knights of the Garter
Chancellors of the Duchy of Lancaster
Richard
People from Kimbolton, Cambridgeshire